Origination of Organismal Form: Beyond the Gene in Developmental and Evolutionary Biology is an anthology published in 2003 edited by Gerd B. Müller and Stuart A. Newman. The book is the outcome of the 4th Altenberg Workshop in Theoretical Biology on "Origins of Organismal Form: Beyond the Gene Paradigm", hosted in 1999 at the Konrad Lorenz Institute for Evolution and Cognition Research. It has been cited over 200 times and has a major influence on extended evolutionary synthesis research.

Description of the book
The book explores the multiple factors that may have been responsible for the origination of biological form in multicellular life.  These biological forms include limbs, segmented structures, and different body symmetries.

It explores why the basic body plans of nearly all multicellular life arose in the relatively short time span of the Cambrian Explosion.  The authors focus on physical factors (structuralism) other than changes in an organism's genome that may have caused multicellular life to form new structures. These physical factors include differential adhesion of cells and feedback oscillations between cells.

The book also presents recent experimental results that examine how the same embryonic tissues or tumor cells can be coaxed into forming dramatically different structures under different environmental conditions.

One of the goals of the book is to stimulate research that may lead to a more comprehensive theory of evolution. It is frequently cited as foundational to the development of the extended evolutionary synthesis.

List of contributions 

 Origination of Organismal Form: The Forgotten Cause in Evolutionary Theory, Gerd B. Müller and Stuart A. Newman
 The Cambrian "Explosion" of Metazoans, Simon Conway Morris
 Convergence and Homoplasy in the Evolution of Organismal Form, Pat Willmer
 Homology:The Evolution of Morphological Organization, Gerd B. Müller
 Only Details Determine, Roy J. Britten
 The Reactive Genome, Scott F. Gilbert
 Tissue Specificity: Structural Cues Allow Diverse Phenotypes from a Constant Genotype, Mina J. Bissell, I. Saira Mian, Derek Radisky and Eva Turley
 Genes, Cell Behavior, and the Evolution of Form, Ellen Larsen
 Cell Adhesive Interactions and Tissue Self-Organization, Malcolm Steinberg
 Gradients, Diffusion, and Genes in Pattern Formation, H. Frederik Nijhout
 A Biochemical Oscillator Linked to Vertebrate Segmentation, Olivier Pourquié
 Organization through Intra-Inter Dynamics, Kunihiko Kaneko
 From Physics to Development: The Evolution of Morphogenetic Mechanisms, Stuart A. Newman
 Phenotypic Plasticity and Evolution by Genetic Assimilation, Vidyanand Nanjundiah
 Genetic and Epigenetic Factors in the Origin of the Tetrapod Limb, Günter P. Wagner and Chi-hua Chiu
 Epigenesis and Evolution of Brains: From Embryonic Divisions to Functional Systems, Georg F. Striedter
 Boundary Constraints for the Emergence of Form, Diego Rasskin-Gutman

References
 
2003 non-fiction books
Biology books
Books about evolution
Extended evolutionary synthesis
Developmental biology
Evolutionary developmental biology